Allophylus pachyphyllus is a species of plant in the family Sapindaceae. It is endemic to Jamaica.

References

pachyphyllus
Vulnerable plants
Endemic flora of Jamaica
Taxonomy articles created by Polbot